God Is a Bullet is the ninth studio album by The Mission. It was released at the end of April 2007 by SPV Records in Germany and Cooking Vinyl in the UK. The album features guest appearances by Julianne Regan, Tim Bricheno and Simon Hinkler. It was preceded by the single "Keep It in the Family" which was followed by "Blush".

Track listing

Personnel
Wayne Hussey – lead vocals, guitars, piano
Mark Gemini Thwaite – guitar, trumpet, trombone, piano and vocals
Rich Vernon – bass
Steve Spring – drums and percussion
Julianne Regan – backing vocals on "Still Deep Waters" and "Aquarius & Gemini"
Tim Bricheno – guitar on "Running with Scissors", "Absolution" and "Blush"
Simon Hinkler – guitar on "Grotesque"
Caroline Dale – cello and strings arrangement on "Draped in Red", "Aquarius & Gemini", "Dumb" and "Grotesque"
Cathy Thompson – violin on "Draped in Red", "Aquarius & Gemini", "Dumb" and "Grotesque"

Technical personnel
Wayne Hussey – engineering, mixing and production
Greg Freeman – engineer and mixing
Andy Baldwin – mastering
John Reynolds – engineer (strings)

Design
Cinthya Hussey  - Design/Photography

References

2007 albums
The Mission (band) albums
Cooking Vinyl albums